Superman III is a 1983 superhero film directed by Richard Lester from a screenplay by David Newman and Leslie Newman based on the DC Comics character Superman. It is the third installment in the Superman film series and a sequel to Superman II (1980). The film features a cast of Christopher Reeve, Richard Pryor, Jackie Cooper, Marc McClure, Annette O'Toole, Annie Ross, Pamela Stephenson, Robert Vaughn, and Margot Kidder.

Although the film recouped its budget of $39 million, it proved less successful than the first two Superman films, both financially and critically. While harsh criticism focused on the film's comedic and campy tone, as well as on the casting and performance of Pryor, the special effects and Christopher Reeve's performance as Superman were praised.

A sequel, Superman IV: The Quest for Peace, was released in July 1987.

Plot

The Metropolis-based conglomerate Webscoe hires Gus Gorman, a talented computer programmer. Gus embezzles from his employer through salami slicing, which brings him to the attention of CEO Ross Webster. Webster is intrigued by Gus' potential to help him financially. Webster, his sister Vera, and Webster's girlfriend Lorelei blackmail Gus into helping him.

At the Daily Planet, Clark Kent convinces Perry White to let him and Jimmy Olsen visit Smallville for Clark's high-school reunion, while fellow reporter and Clark's unrequited romantic interest Lois Lane leaves for a Bermuda vacation. En route, as Superman, Kent extinguishes a fire in a chemical plant containing unstable beltric acid, which produces corrosive vapor when superheated.

At the reunion, Clark reunites with childhood friend Lana Lang, a divorcée with a young son named Ricky. Clark is harassed by Brad Wilson, his former bully and Lana's ex-boyfriend. Later, while having a picnic with Lana, Superman saves an unconscious Ricky from being killed by a combine harvester.

Infuriated by Colombia's refusal to do business with him, Webster orders Gus to command Vulcan, an American weather satellite, to create a tornado to destroy Colombia's coffee crop, allowing Webster to corner the market. Gus travels to Smallville to use a Webscoe subsidiary to reprogram the satellite. Although Vulcan creates a devastating storm, Superman neutralizes it. Seeing Superman as a threat to his plans, Webster orders Gus to fabricate Kryptonite. Gus uses Vulcan to locate and analyze Krypton's debris. As one of the elements of Kryptonite is unknown, he substitutes tar.

Lana convinces Superman to appear at Ricky's birthday party, but Smallville turns it into a town celebration. Gus and Vera, disguised as Army officers, give Superman the flawed Kryptonite as an award. Although it has no immediate effect, Superman becomes selfish, and then commits petty acts of vandalism such as straightening the Leaning Tower of Pisa and blowing out the Olympic Flame.

Gus asks Webster to build the world's most sophisticated supercomputer; the CEO agrees, if Gus creates an energy crisis by directing all oil tankers to the middle of the Atlantic Ocean. When the captain of one tanker insists on maintaining his original course, Lorelei seduces Superman, persuading him to waylay the tanker and breach its double hull, causing an oil spill. The villains decamp to the supercomputer's location in Glen Canyon.

Superman suffers a nervous breakdown and splits into two beings: the immoral, corrupted dark Superman and the moral, mild-mannered Clark Kent. The two fight in a junkyard, with Clark eventually defeating his evil self. Regaining his sanity, Superman repairs the damage he caused in the oil spill and heads west to deal with the villains. After defending himself from exploding rockets and an ASALM missile, Superman confronts Webster, Vera, and Lorelei. The supercomputer identifies Superman's weakness and unleashes a beam of pure Kryptonite.

Guilt-ridden and horrified by the notion of "going down in history as the man who killed Superman", Gus destroys the Kryptonite ray with a firefighter's axe. Superman escapes, but the computer becomes self-aware, defending itself against Gus's attempts to disable it. The computer transforms Vera into a cyborg that attacks her brother and Lorelei with beams of energy that immobilize them. Superman returns with beltric acid, which the supercomputer believes is not dangerous. The intense heat emitted by the supercomputer causes the acid to become volatile, destroying it. Superman leaves Webster and his cronies for the authorities, but thanks Gus for saving his life. The pair fly off to a coal mine  where Superman transforms coal into a diamond for Lana. Gus declines to return to Metropolis, deciding to make a fresh start in West Virginia.

As Clark, Superman visits Lana after she moves to Metropolis. A drunken Brad attacks Clark believing he was proposing to her, but the reporter defeats him without revealing his secret identity. Lana's new job as Perry White's secretary surprises Lois Lane, who returns from her vacation with an article about corruption in Bermuda, and has a newfound respect for Clark after reading his story. Before lunch with Lana, Superman restores the Leaning Tower of Pisa and flies into the sunrise for further adventures.

Cast
 Christopher Reeve as Clark Kent / Superman: After discovering his origins in the earlier films, he sets himself to helping those on Earth. After defeating his arch enemies, Lex Luthor twice and General Zod, Superman comes face-to-face with a new villain: the megalomaniac Ross Webster, who is determined to control the world's coffee and oil supplies. Superman also battles personal demons after an exposure to a synthetic form of kryptonite that corrupts him.
 Richard Pryor as August "Gus" Gorman: A bumbling computer genius who works for Ross Webster and inadvertently gets mixed up in Webster's scheme to destroy Superman.
 Jackie Cooper as Perry White: The editor of the Daily Planet.
 Marc McClure as Jimmy Olsen: A photographer for the Daily Planet.
 Annette O'Toole as Lana Lang: Clark's high school friend who reconciles with Clark after seeing him during their high school reunion. O'Toole later portrayed Martha Kent on the Superman television series Smallville.
 Robert Vaughn as Ross "Bubba" Webster: A villainous, super-wealthy industrialist and philanthropist. After Superman prevents him from taking over the world's coffee supply, Ross is determined to destroy Superman before he can stop his plan to control the world's oil supply. He is an original character created for the movie.
 Annie Ross as Vera Webster: Ross' sister and partner in his corporation and villainous plans.
 Pamela Stephenson as Lorelei Ambrosia: Ross' assistant. Lorelei, a voluptuous blonde bombshell, is well-read, articulate and skilled in computers, but conceals her intelligence from Ross and Vera, to whom she adopts the appearance of a superficial, stereotypical klutz. As part of Ross' plan, she seduces Superman.
 Margot Kidder as Lois Lane: A reporter at the Daily Planet who has a history with both Clark Kent and Superman. She is away from Metropolis on vacation to Bermuda, which put her in the middle of a front-page story.
 Gavan O'Herlihy as Brad Wilson: Lana's ex-boyfriend and Clark's high school rival.

Frank Oz originally had a cameo as a surgeon, but the scene was deleted from the final cut, although it was later included in the TV extended version of the film. Shane Rimmer, who had a role in Superman II as a NASA controller, has a small part as a state police officer. Pamela Mandell, who played a diner waitress in the same film, appears here as the hapless wife of a Daily Planet sweepstakes winner. Aaron Smolinski, who had played baby Clark Kent in the first film, appears in this one as the little boy next to the photo booth Superman changes into. He also would later appear in Man of Steel as a communications officer.

Production

Development
Richard Donner confirmed that he had been interested in writing at least two more Superman films, which he intended to allow Tom Mankiewicz to direct, and that he would have included Brainiac as the villain of the third film. However, Donner departed the series during the production of Superman II. The film was formally announced at the 33rd Cannes Film Festival in May 1980, months before the theatrical release of the second film. In December 1980, producer Ilya Salkind wrote a treatment for this film that included Brainiac, Mister Mxyzptlk and Supergirl. The treatment was released online in 2007. The Mr. Mxyzptlk portrayed in the outline varies from his good-humored comic counterpart, as he uses his abilities to cause serious harm. Dudley Moore was the top choice to play the role. Meanwhile, in the same treatment, Brainiac was from Colu and had discovered Supergirl in the same way that Superman was found by the Kents. Brainiac is portrayed as a surrogate father to Supergirl and eventually fell in love with his "daughter", who did not reciprocate his feelings, as she had fallen in love with Superman. Brainiac retaliates by using a personality machine to corrupt and manipulate Superman. The climax of the film would have seen Superman, Supergirl, Brainiac, Jimmy Olsen, and Lana Lang time travel to the Middle Ages for a final confrontation in a fiefdom taken over by Brainiac. After defeating him and leaving him behind as a helpless serf, Superman and Supergirl would have either been married at either the end of Superman III or in Superman IV. The treatment was rejected by Warner Bros. Pictures as being too complex and expensive to shoot, and Salkind additionally wanted to save the character of Supergirl for a solo film. Because of the high budgets required for the series the Salkinds considered selling the rights to the series to Dino De Laurentiis. The significance of computers to the plot, the villains' plan to corrupt Superman, and the splitting of him into a good and an evil half would be carried over into the final film. The film was originally intended to be titled Superman vs. Superman, but it was retitled after the producers of Kramer vs. Kramer threatened a lawsuit.

Casting
Both Gene Hackman and Margot Kidder are said to have been angry with the way the Salkinds treated Superman director Richard Donner, with Hackman retaliating by refusing to reprise the role of Lex Luthor. After Margot Kidder publicly criticized the Salkinds for their treatment of Donner, the producers reportedly "punished" the actress by reducing her role in Superman III to a brief appearance. Hackman later denied such claims, stating that he had been busy with other movies and the consensus that making Luthor a constant villain would be akin to incessant horror movie sequels where a serial killer keeps coming back from the grave. Hackman would reprise his role as Lex Luthor in Superman IV, with which the Salkinds had no involvement. In his commentary for the 2006 DVD release of Superman III, Ilya Salkind denied any ill will between Margot Kidder and his production team and denied the claim that her part was cut for retaliation. Instead, he said, the creative team decided to pursue a different direction for a love interest for Superman, believing the Lois and Clark relationship had been played out in the first two films, (but could be revisited in the future). With the choice to give a more prominent role to Lana Lang, Lois' part was reduced for story reasons. Salkind also denied the reports about Gene Hackman being upset with him, stating that Hackman was unable to return because of other film commitments.

After an appearance by Richard Pryor on The Tonight Show, telling Johnny Carson how much he enjoyed seeing Superman II, the Salkinds were eager to cast him in a prominent role in the third film, riding on Pryor's success in films such as Silver Streak, Stir Crazy and The Toy. Pryor accepted a $5 million salary to appear in the film. Following the release of the film, Pryor signed a five-year contract with Columbia Pictures worth $40 million.

Filming
Principal photography commenced on June 21, 1982. Most of the interior scenes were shot, like the previous Superman films, at Pinewood Studios outside London. The junkyard scene was filmed on Pinewood's backlot. The coal mine scene, where Superman leaves Gus, was filmed at Battersea Power Station, where Richard Lester had previously shot scenes for the Beatles film Help!.
Most exteriors were filmed in Calgary, Alberta due to Canada's tax breaks for film companies. Superman's drinking binge was filmed at the St. Louis Hotel in Downtown East Village, Calgary, while other scenes such as the slapstick-comedy opening were shot several blocks to the west. While the supercomputer set was created on Pinewood's 007 Stage, exteriors were shot at Glen Canyon in Utah.

Effects and animation
The film includes "the same special effects team" from the prior two films.
Atari, part of Warner, created the video game computer animation for the missile defense scene.

Music

As with the previous sequel, the musical score was composed and conducted by Ken Thorne, using the Superman theme and most other themes from the first film composed by John Williams. Giorgio Moroder was hired to create songs for the film, though their use in the film is minimal.

Release

Theatrical
Superman III was shown at the Uptown Theater in Washington, D.C. on June 12, 1983, and then had its New York premiere on June 14, 1983, at Cinema I. It was released in theatres on June 17, 1983, in the United States and July 19, 1983, in the United Kingdom.

Marketing
William Kotzwinkle wrote a novelization of the film published in paperback by Warner Books in the U.S. and by Arrow Books in the United Kingdom to coincide with the film's release; Severn House published a British hardcover edition. Kotzwinkle thought the novelization "a delight the world has yet to find out about." However, writing in Voice of Youth Advocates, Roberta Rogow hoped this would be the final Superman film and said, "Kotzwinkle has done his usual good job of translating the screenplay into a novel, but there are nasty undertones to the film, and there are nasty undertones to the novel as well. Adults may enjoy the novel on its own merits, as a Black Comedy of sorts, but it's not written for kids, and most of the under-15 crowd will either be puzzled or revolted by Kotzwinkle's dour humor."

Extended television edition
Like the previous films, a separate extended edition was produced. It was aired on ABC. The opening credits were in outer space, featuring an edited version of the film's end credit theme music, serving as an opening theme. This is followed by a number of scenes, including additional dialogue but not added into any of the official VHS, DVD or Blu-ray cuts of the film. The "Deluxe Edition" of Superman III, released in 2006 on par with the DVD release of Superman Returns, included these scenes in its extra features section as "deleted scenes".

Reception

Box office
Superman III grossed $60 million at the United States box office, and $20.2 million internationally, for a total of $80.2 million worldwide. The film was the 12th highest-grossing film of 1983 in North America.

Critical response
The website's critical consensus states, "When not overusing sight gags, slapstick and Richard Pryor, Superman III resorts to plot points rehashed from the previous Superman flicks." The film has a Metacritic rating of 44, indicating "mixed or average reviews" from 13 professional reviewers.

Film critic Leonard Maltin said that Superman III was an "appalling sequel that trashed everything that Superman was about for the sake of cheap laughs and a co-starring role for Richard Pryor". The film was nominated for two Razzie Awards including Worst Supporting Actor for Richard Pryor and Worst Musical Score for Giorgio Moroder. Audiences also saw Robert Vaughn's villainous Ross Webster as an inferior fill-in for Lex Luthor.

Christopher John reviewed Superman III in Ares Magazine #16 and commented that "compared to the first film in this series, everything about Superman III is a joke, a harsh cruel joke played on all the people who wanted to see more of the Superman they saw a few years ago."

Colin Greenland reviewed Superman III for Imagine magazine, and stated that "What ultimately spoils the fun in Superman III is not the incoherent story or even the technophobia. It is simply overloaded - too many ideas, too many gadgets, too many stars (Pamela Stephenson is completely wasted in a part which would have been too dumb for Goldie Hawn). The wiring all comes loose at the end; an anticlimax, and a rushed one at that."

Fans of the Superman series placed a great deal of the blame on director Richard Lester. Lester made a number of popular comedies in the 1960s — including The Beatles' A Hard Day's Night — before being hired by the Salkinds in the 1970s for their successful Three Musketeers series, as well as Superman II which, although better received, was also criticised for unnecessary sight gags and slapstick. Lester broke tradition by setting the opening credits for Superman III during a prolonged slapstick sequence rather than in outer space.

The film's screenplay, by David and Leslie Newman, was also criticized. When Richard Donner was hired to direct the first two films, he found the Newmans' scripts so distasteful that he hired Tom Mankiewicz for heavy rewrites. Since Donner and Mankiewicz were no longer attached, the Salkinds were free to bring their version of Superman to the screen and once again hired the Newmans for writing duties. Reeve stated in his autobiography that the original script for the first Superman had so many puns and gags that it risked having Superman earn a reputation akin to that of Batman being associated with the campy TV show of the 1960s. "In one scene in this script, Superman would be in pursuit of Lex Luthor, identified by his bald head and grab him, only to realize he had captured Telly Savalas who would remark "Who loves ya, baby?" and offer Superman a lollipop. Dick [Donner] had done away with much of that inanity."

Reeve's own performance as a corrupted Man of Steel received praise, particularly the junkyard battle between this newly darkened Superman and Clark Kent. One of the film's positive reviews was from the fiction writer Donald Barthelme, who praised Reeve as "perfect", also describing Vaughn as "essentially playing William Buckley - all those delicious ponderings, popping of the eyes, licking of the corner of the mouth."

References

External links

 Official DC Comics Site
 Official Warner Bros. Site
 
 
 
 
 
 
 

1980s American films
1980s British films
1980s English-language films
1980s superhero films
1983 films
American sequel films
American superhero films
British sequel films
British superhero films
Films about computing
Films directed by Richard Lester
Films produced by Pierre Spengler
Films scored by Giorgio Moroder
Films scored by Ken Thorne
Films set in Colombia
Films set in Kansas
Films set in West Virginia
Films shot in Buckinghamshire
Films shot in Calgary
Films shot in England
Films shot in Italy
Films shot in Utah
Films shot at Pinewood Studios
Films with screenplays by David Newman (screenwriter)
Films with screenplays by Leslie Newman
Pisa in fiction
Superman (1978 film series)
Superman films
Warner Bros. films